Hauzel is a clan found to be within the Paite group of the Zos Zomi tribe popularly known as Zomi and Mizo by different clans of the tribe particularly in Manipur and Mizoram areas, northeast of India. They are also found in the Chin State of Burma as a Tedim-Chin sub-clan. The Hauzel are mostly concentrated in Lamka, the second largest town of Manipur state, India and many of them are living in Mizoram. Hauzel are mostly highly educated and they are known for their education and general administration skills.

Ethnic groups in Myanmar
Ethnic groups in India